Thomas Bartlett (1789–1864) was an English clergyman and theological writer.

Life
Bartlett was educated at St Edmund Hall, Oxford, and graduated B.A. 1813, and M.A. 1816 [Joseph Foster, 'Alumni Oxonienses']. He held the living of Kingstone, near Canterbury, from 1816 to 1852; he was then preferred to Chevening, near Sevenoaks. In 1854 he moved on to Luton, Bedfordshire, and in 1857 to Burton Latimer, Northamptonshire. In 1832 he became one of the Six preachers of Canterbury Cathedral.

Works
While at Kingstone he produced a succession of pamphlets, letters, and sermons, maintaining evangelical tenets. He married a great-great-niece of Bishop Joseph Butler, the author of the Analogy, and he published a Memoir of the Life, Character, and Writings of Bishop Butler (1839), followed by an index to the Analogy (1842).

References

Attribution

1789 births
1864 deaths
19th-century Anglican theologians
19th-century English Anglican priests
Alumni of St Edmund Hall, Oxford
People from Kingston, Kent